Satakha (Pron:/,  Stækhæ/) is a town and a town area committee in Zunheboto district in the state of Nagaland, India.
It is a sub division and administration is headed by the office of Additional Deputy Commissioner.
It has five major colonies, each headed by a Gaon Bura (GB)
1. Administration by Vitoho Zhimo
2. School Colony by Vihozhe Zhimo
3. Center Colony by Hosheto Mürrü
4. B-Khel by Kajeto Zhimo
5. A-Khel by Ahovi Zhimo.

State Bank Of India is the only banking facility in the town.
Satakha is also a headquarter of 111 Battalion Border Security Force.

See also
 Aghunato
 Akuluto

References

Cities and towns in Zünheboto district